Vermont Route 112 (VT 112) is a short  state highway in southern Vermont, United States. It is a continuation of Massachusetts Route 112, running from the state line in Halifax north to an intersection with VT 100 in the village of Jacksonville. VT 112 runs in a northwest-southeast trajectory (signed north–south) and is entirely contained within Windham County.

Route description
Vermont Route 112 begins in the south at the Massachusetts state border, where Massachusetts Route 112 crosses from Colrain, Massachusetts into Halifax, Vermont. The highway runs northwest, passing west of Halifax, and crossing into the town of Whitingham, where it meets the northern terminus of town-maintained Vermont Route 8A, itself a short northern extension of Massachusetts Route 8A. Route 112 continues to the northwest, passing directly into the village of Jacksonville, where it ends at an intersection with Route 100.

Major intersections

References

External links

112
Transportation in Windham County, Vermont